Review of Research in Education is a peer-reviewed academic journal published by SAGE Publications on behalf of the American Educational Research Association. It covers research in the field of education. The editors-in-chief for 2019 are Terri Pigott, Anne Marie Ryan, and Charles Tocci (Loyola University Chicago). The 2020 editors are Jeanne Powers, Gustavo Fischman, and Margarita Pivovarova (Arizona State University). It was established in 1973. The 2021 editors are Greg Kazinsky, Ethan Paterson, and Robbert Snow.

Mission Statement 
Review of Research in Education (RRE), published annually, provides an overview and descriptive analysis of selected topics of relevant research literature through critical and synthesizing essays. RRE promotes discussion and controversy about research problems in addition to pulling together and summarizing the work in a field.

Abstracting and indexing 
The journal is abstracted and indexed in Scopus and the Social Sciences Citation Index. According to the Journal Citation Reports, its 2017 impact factor is 1.594, ranking it 91 out of 238 journals in the category "Education & Educational Research".

References

External links 
 

Annual journals
Education journals
English-language journals
Publications established in 1973
SAGE Publishing academic journals